Pierre Sang Boyer is a South-Korean born French chef. In 2011, he was a finalist at the French version of Top Chef.

Early life and education 
Born in Seoul, Pierre Sang Boyer was adopted at the age of seven by a French couple and grew up in Lantriac in the department of Haute-Loire.

Career 
Pierre Sang Boyer participated in 2011 at the second season of the French version of Top Chef and ended finalist. He opened his own restaurant in the 11th arrondissement of Paris in the popular quarter of Oberkampf, a neo-bistrot named Pierre Sang in Oberkamp. With two Korean chefs, he proposes a market cuisine with Asian products.

Pierre Sang in Oberkampf 
It is the first restaurant to have opened in 2012, after the participation of Pierre Sang in Top Chef in 2011. It advocates local food using season products and attaches a lot of importance to their origins.

Pierre Sang on Gambey 
It is the second restaurant that opened in 2014, and is located rue Gambey, at a few metres of the first one. This restaurant is of a higher range.

Bibliography

References 

Chefs from Paris
People from Seoul
Living people
French people of Korean descent
Naturalized citizens of France
Year of birth missing (living people)